The following is a list of the 512 communes in the French department of Isère.

The communes cooperate in the following intercommunalities (as of 2020):
Grenoble-Alpes Métropole
Communauté d'agglomération du Pays Voironnais
Communauté d'agglomération Porte de l'Isère
Communauté d'agglomération Vienne Condrieu (partly)
Communauté de communes Les Balcons du Dauphiné
Communauté de communes de Bièvre Est
Communauté de communes Bièvre Isère
Communauté de communes Cœur de Chartreuse (partly)
Communauté de communes des Collines du Nord Dauphiné
Communauté de communes Entre Bièvre et Rhône
Communauté de communes Le Grésivaudan
Communauté de communes Lyon Saint-Exupéry en Dauphiné
Communauté de communes du Massif du Vercors
Communauté de communes de la Matheysine
Communauté de communes de l'Oisans
CC Saint-Marcellin Vercors Isère Communauté
Communauté de communes du Trièves
Communauté de communes Les Vals du Dauphiné

References

Isere